Carrier Houses, also known as the Carrier-Ward House and Carrier-McBrayer House, are two historic homes located near Rutherfordton, Rutherford County, North Carolina.  The Carrier-Ward House was built in 1879, and is a two-story, weatherboarded, side-gabled Queen Anne-style frame house.  It has a front projecting wing and a three-story square tower with pyramidal roof.  The Carrier-McBrayer House was built about 1835, and is a transitional Federal / Greek Revival style I-house with two-story ell.  The weatherboarded house sits on a brick foundation.

It was added to the National Register of Historic Places in 1992.

References

Houses on the National Register of Historic Places in North Carolina
Federal architecture in North Carolina
Greek Revival houses in North Carolina
Queen Anne architecture in North Carolina
Houses completed in 1835
Houses in Rutherford County, North Carolina
National Register of Historic Places in Rutherford County, North Carolina
Rutherfordton, North Carolina